The Sherwood Studio Building was an artists' apartment building at 58 West 57th Street, at the southeast corner with Sixth Avenue (Avenue of the Americas) in Midtown Manhattan, New York City. The building was constructed in 1879 as artists' apartments. It was demolished in 1960 to permit the construction of a large apartment building called Hemisphere House.

It differed from the other studio buildings of its time in its extent and in the amenities it offered. It was taller than most, with great floor-to-ceiling windows, many of which gathered northern light across an unusually broad street. In addition to spacious studios, its apartments contained bedrooms, bathrooms, and reception rooms. Each apartment had central heating, gas light, and, for internal communication, electric bells and speaking tubes. The building's elevator was large enough to fit oversize works of art. There was an exhibition hall that could also be used for receptions and parties. An on-site café-restaurant helped to compensate for the building's lack of kitchenettes and became popular for the social interaction it enabled as well as the meals it provided.

In its early years, the building adjoined the homes of prosperous art collectors and a later transformation brought luxury shops and tony cultural institutions as its neighbors. With all these advantages, "the Sherwood", as it came to be called, succeeded in attracting artists who were comfortably well off, whether because they had already established successful careers or because they benefited from inherited wealth. Moreover, its location and amenities made it particularly attractive to single women and small families.

History of the site

When it opened and for the first few decades of its existence, the Sherwood Studio Building attracted as its tenants those relatively mature New York artists whose careers had flourished during the last third of the 19th century. Many of the men in this group had met each other in Paris when, in common with many other American artists of the period, they sought to increase the sophistication of their work by exposure to European Beaux-Arts influences. The prices they received for their paintings and sculptures were generally lower than the prices paid for the work of established European artists, but they were nonetheless sufficient for them to live comfortably. Although many of the men and women who lived in the building were widely collected in their time, however, few retained substantial reputations into the 21st century.

Examples of late 19th century residents who were once popular include  John Henry Dolph (1835–1903), known for landscapes and pictures of pet dogs and kittens; Adolfo Müller-Ury (1862–1947), known for portraits and still lifes; Francis Coates Jones (1857–1932), known for floral, figure, and mural painting; and Ralph Albert Blakelock (1847–1919), known for landscapes and portraits. May Wilson Preston (1873–1949), an illustrator and painter of figures and landscapes, is an example of an artist who lived in the building during the first two decades of the 20th century. During the 1920s, Floyd MacMillan Davis (1896–1966), an illustrator, and his wife, Gladys Rockmore Davis (1901–1967), a figure, landscape, and portrait painter. Ilse Bischoff (1901–1990), illustrator, printmaker, and painter, lived there in the 1930s. A few residents who continue to be well known in the 21st century include Robert Henri, Al Hirschfeld, and Augustus Saint-Gaudens The building's women artists were also generally well known during their lives but have not retained their reputations into the 21st century. Of the many women artists who took up tenancies during the early years, these few stand as examples:  Eleanor Greatorex (from 1880), Helen Corson Hovenden (from 1882), Cecile de Wentworth (from 1883), Rhoda Holmes Nicholls (from 1884), Maria Matilda Brooks (from 1887), and Maria a'Becket (from 1888). A relatively comprehensive list of early tenants is given as an appendix to an article that appeared in the Archives of American Art Journal in 1996.

Notes

References
	

1880 establishments in New York (state)
57th Street (Manhattan)
Sixth Avenue
Apartment buildings in New York City
Demolished buildings and structures in Manhattan
Midtown Manhattan
Residential buildings completed in 1880
Residential buildings in Manhattan
Buildings and structures demolished in 1960
Artist studios in New York City